Ugly Americans was an American rock band from Austin, Texas consisting of former members of Cracker, Mojo Nixon, and Poi Dog Pondering.

History
Ugly Americans was founded in 1993 by musicians who played together at jam sessions organized by bassist Sean McCarthy at Antone's in Austin. The group played the HORDE Tour in 1994 and then supported Dave Matthews Band and Big Head Todd & the Monsters on tour in 1995. They released a live album in 1995 and a studio album in 1996; a sophomore studio effort arrived in 1998 before the band's breakup. Lead singer and songwriter Bob Schneider went on to a successful solo career.

Members
Bob Schneider - vocals
Sean McCarthy - bass
David Robinson - drums
Max Evans - guitar
Bruce Hughes - guitar
 Corey Mauser - Keyboards 
 David Boyle - Keyboards

Discography
Ugly Americans (What Are Records, 1995)
Stereophonic Spanish Fly (Capricorn Records, 1996)
Boom Boom Baby (Capricorn records, 1998)

References

Rock music groups from Texas
Musical groups from Austin, Texas
Musical groups established in 1993
1993 establishments in Texas